Trestonia rugosicollis is a species of beetle in the family Cerambycidae. It was described by Martins, Galileo and de Oliveira in 2009.

References

rugosicollis
Beetles described in 2009